Louis Antériou (14 June 1887 – 5 March 1931) was a French politician.

Antériou was born in La Voulte-sur-Rhône.  He represented the Republican-Socialist Party in the Chamber of Deputies from 1919 to 1931. He was a freemason.

Antériou was Minister of Pensions in 1925, in the administration of Paul Painlevé and continued in the role, under Raymond Poincaré, from 1928 to 1929.

References

1887 births
1931 deaths
People from Ardèche
Politicians from Auvergne-Rhône-Alpes
Republican-Socialist Party politicians
French Ministers of Pensions
Members of the 12th Chamber of Deputies of the French Third Republic
Members of the 13th Chamber of Deputies of the French Third Republic
Members of the 14th Chamber of Deputies of the French Third Republic
French Freemasons